Daniel Christian Fueter (1720–1785), whose name was variously written as Fouaitier and Fouetter, was a Swiss-American silversmith and medalist, active in New York City from about 1754 until 1764 or 1766.

Fueter was born in Bern, Switzerland, where he worked as a goldsmith until 1749. After he took part in a failed political conspiracy, he was condemned to death, and fled to London. His son, the medalist Christian Fueter, was born in London in 1752, and Fueter himself is mentioned in W. Chaffee's Gilda Aurifabrorum as living in Chelsea, "next door to Man in ye Moon, on the 8th December, 1753." Around 1754 he arrived in New York City, where he was made freeman in 1759 and established his business as gold and silversmith. While in New York, he published a series of advertisements:

Sometime around 1764 or 1766 he retired and moved to Bethlehem, Pennsylvania. In 1769 political turmoil in Switzerland had subsided, and he returned to live beside Lake Neuchâtel until his death.

His medals include the 1764 George III Indian Peace Medal (also known as the Happy While United Medal), as well as a 1761 medal bestowed on a Native American chief for the storming of Montreal by the British in 1760. His silver is collected in the Metropolitan Museum of Art, Brooklyn Museum, Historic Deerfield, Winterthur Museum, and Yale University Art Gallery.

References 
 New York newspaper advertisements and news items: 1777-1779, University of Oxford Text Archive.
 "Auctions", The New York Times, January 19, 1990, page 84.
 "The Maker of the Montreal Indian Medal", in the American Journal of Numismatics, Volumes 42-43, pages 155-156.
 American Silver of the XVII & XVIII Centuries: A Study Based on the Clearwater Collection, Alphonso Trumpbour Clearwater, Clara Louise Avery, Metropolitan Museum of Art, 1920, pages 82-83.
 American Rococo, 1750-1775: Elegance in Ornament, Morrison Heckscher and Leslie Greene Bowman, Metropolitan Museum of Art, 1992, page 76.
 The Magazine Antiques, Volume 127, Straight Enterprises, 1985.
 "FUETER, Daniel Christian", Medal Artists database.
 George III Indian Peace Medal, 1764, Massachusetts Historical Society.
 Indian Peace Medal, National Portrait Gallery.
 "Henry Needham Flynt Silver and Metalware Collection", Historic Deerfield.

External links
 

American silversmiths
American medallists
1720 births
1785 deaths